Turlington is an unincorporated community in eastern Harnett County, North Carolina, United States,  situated between the towns of Coats and Erwin, North Carolina. It is a part of the Dunn Micropolitan Area, which is also a part of the greater Raleigh–Durham–Cary Combined Statistical Area (CSA) as defined by the United States Census Bureau.

Other names for the community previously have included Slocumb Crossroads or Turlington Crossroads . An unsuccessful movement was undertaken in 1893 to have the Harnett County seat moved from Lillington to Turlington Crossroads .

References
 
 

Unincorporated communities in Harnett County, North Carolina
Unincorporated communities in North Carolina